Clytie haifae is a moth of the family Erebidae first described by O. Habich in 1905. It is found along the coast of Algeria, Morocco, Sudan, Egypt, Lebanon and Israel.

This species goes through multiple generations per year. Adults are on wing from March to May and September.

The larvae feed on Tamarix species.

References

External links

Image

Ophiusina
Moths described in 1905
Moths of Africa
Moths of the Middle East